Will Sherman (October 20, 1927 – October 11, 1997) was an American football defensive back who played with the National Football League (NFL)'s Los Angeles Rams from 1954 to 1960.

1927 births
1997 deaths
People from Weed, California
American football safeties
Dallas Texans (NFL) players
Los Angeles Rams players
Minnesota Vikings players
Saint Mary's Gaels football players
Western Conference Pro Bowl players
Players of American football from California